Ivan G. Court was the 65th mayor of Saint John, New Brunswick in Canada from May 28, 2008 – May 28, 2012. He was succeeded by Mel Norton.

In 2014, Court attempted a run in provincial politics in the riding of Saint John Lancaster and said he believes he has the credentials to improve the situation for the people of his riding. "I served 14 years on Common Council, ten as a Councillor and four as the mayor", Court said. "I was involved heavily in sports. I believe I have the knowledge base. I worked with the Ministers of Local Government. I don't think there’s a politician right now in Fredericton that has my experience working at the national, provincial and municipal levels." However the former mayor was unsuccessful losing the Liberal nomination to former city councillor Peter McGuire.

See also
List of mayors of Saint John, New Brunswick
Saint John City Council

References

Mayors of Saint John, New Brunswick
Living people
Year of birth missing (living people)